Scythris senecai is a moth of the family Scythrididae. It was described by Bengt Å. Bengtsson in 1997. It is found in Iran, Libya, Syria and Yemen.

References

senecai
Moths described in 1997